Rayshan is a sub-district located in the Al Ashah District, 'Amran Governorate, Yemen. Rayshan had a population of 2845 according to the 2004 census.

References 

Sub-districts in Al Ashah District